Eric Peters may refer to:

 Eric Peters (rugby union) (born 1969), Scottish former amateur and professional rugby union player
 Eric Peters (painter) (born 1952), German painter
 Eric Peters (musician) (born 1972), American musician
 Eric Peters (archer) (born 1997), Canadian archer
 Eric Peters (tennis) (1903–1985), British tennis player